Getama is a furniture company based in Gedsted, Denmark.

History
The company was founded in 1899 as Gedsted Tang- og Madratsfabrik when the young carpenter Carl Pedersen started a production of seaweed mattresses in his home town. The seaweed harvested in the Limfjord was also sold to other companies. The company moved into furniture production in 1910. In 1949, it launched a collaboration with Gans Wegner. The furniture factory grew to become the largest employer in the small town of Gedsted with a work force of around 100. The name of the company was changed to Getama in 1053.

Designers
Getama produces furniture designed by designers such as Hans Wegner, Nanna Ditzel and Mogens Koch.

References

Rxternal links
 Official website

Furniture companies of Denmark
Danish companies established in 1899